Michael Shapiro is an American actor, and theatre director, best known for voicing the Half-Life characters G-Man and Barney Calhoun and being the only voice actor who worked in all Half Life games.

Early life
In 1987, Shapiro helped launch the Annex Theater and performed in many of their productions. For a time he lived in Seattle until moving to Brooklyn, New York in 2000.

Career

Michael Shapiro is most famous for voicing Barney Calhoun and the G-Man in all of the characters' appearances in the Half-Life series. Other video games in which he is credited as "Mike Shapiro" are Blood II: The Chosen, Grand Theft Auto: Liberty City Stories and Torin's Passage. He has also voiced many radio and TV commercials. Shapiro is a director of television shows and theater productions, with some of his shows being shown on Strike.TV. In 2007, his TV pilot Family Values, starring Rob Riggle, was screened at the New York Television Festival.

Filmography

Video games

Television

Film

References

External links
 Official website
 

American male voice actors
Living people
American male film actors
Jewish American male actors
20th-century American male actors
21st-century American male actors
American directors
American male video game actors
Year of birth missing (living people)
21st-century American Jews
Place of birth missing (living people)